Wootton Upper School is an academy school located on Hall End Road, in Wootton, England. It teaches years 9–11 in compulsory education and years 12–13 in compulsory education at Kimberley College. Approximately 75% of students previously in compulsory education stay on to the sixth form college. The school specialises in performing arts, such as music, drama and dance.

History
Wootton Upper School started in 1975. As the school buildings were not quite ready, it shared a site with Stewartby Middle School. The first intake was 213 students and they moved onto the Wootton site in November, with 16 teaching staff.

The first headmaster was Stanley Clews, with Deputy Head John Bonerton. The school was complete by 1978. Clews retired in 1987. Catherine Mackenzie took over until 1999, when Anthony Withell became head. In 2014 Michael Gleeson became principal of the school.

The Upper School catchment area covers far more villages than just Wootton. Having achieved Beacon Status in 2001, it is regarded as one of the top upper schools in the county.

The main feeder schools are Holywell and Marston Vale middle schools.

Kimberley College
Kimberley College is a new Sixth form college that opened in Stewartby in April 2014. The college is operated by Wootton Academy Trust, and the two centres share facilities for their sixth form students.

References

Upper schools in the Borough of Bedford
Learning and Skills Beacons
Academies in the Borough of Bedford
Educational institutions established in 1975
1975 establishments in England